Piotr Libicz is a former Canadian soccer player who featured in the National Professional Soccer League, Canadian National Soccer League, and the Canadian Professional Soccer League.

Playing career 
Libicz began his career in the Canadian National Soccer League with Toronto Supra in 1997. During the season he helped Supra reach the postseason, and featured in the semi-finals against Toronto Croatia, and won the series by a score of 8-1 on goals on aggregate. He played in the championship finals against St. Catharines Wolves, but Toronto lost the match to a score of 4-3. During the winter of 1996 he signed with the Toronto Shooting Stars of the National Professional Soccer League, he made seven appearances for the club. Libicz was transferred to Toronto Croatia for the inaugural season of the Canadian Professional Soccer League. He made his debut for the club on September 23, 1998 in a match against St. Catharines Wolves.

In 2000, Libicz signed with the North York Astros of the Canadian Professional Soccer League. He made his debut for the club on June 4, 2000 in a match against Toronto Croatia. At the conclusion of the season he was awarded the CPSL Goalkeeper of the Year. In 2002, he signed with York Region Shooters, and made his debut on May 24, 2002 in a match against the Mississauga Olympians. He helped the Shooters finish fourth in the Eastern Conference, but fell short of securing a postseason berth.

References 

Living people
Canadian soccer players
Canadian Soccer League (1998–present) players
National Professional Soccer League (1984–2001) players
SC Toronto players
North York Astros players
Toronto Shooting Stars players
Toronto Croatia players
Canadian National Soccer League players
York Region Shooters players
Association football goalkeepers
Year of birth missing (living people)